Putino is the name of several rural localities in Russia:
Putino (passing loop), a passing loop in Vereshchaginsky District, Perm Krai
Putino (selo), a selo in Vereshchaginsky District